NGC 6248 is a barred spiral galaxy in the constellation Draco. It was discovered on August 11, 1885 by the American astronomer Lewis A. Swift. The galaxy is located approximately 52 million light years away from earth with an approximate diameter of 47,000 light-years.

See also
 List of NGC Objects

References

External links
 
 
 

6248
10564
058946
Barred spiral galaxies
Draco (constellation)